The Eternal City is a 1915 American silent drama film directed by Hugh Ford and Edwin S. Porter, produced by Adolph Zukor. The movie stars Pauline Frederick in her debut film role, The production is based upon the 1901 novel and 1902 Broadway play of the same name by Hall Caine that starred Viola Allen and Frederic De Belleville. Much of The Eternal City was shot on location in England and Italy before being interrupted by the start of the Great War. The film was released through the specially created Select Film Booking Agency for the Famous Players Film Company.

The Eternal City is now considered lost.
It was remade in 1923, directed by George Fitzmaurice and starring Barbara La Marr, Bert Lytell, and Lionel Barrymore.

Plot
The wife of Leone, a member of the Papal Guard, believing herself to have been deserted, leaves her young son David with the Sisters of Charity and commits suicide. Little David is brought up by the sisters, and turned over to a Padrone, who takes him to London and mistreats him. David is befriended by Dr. Roselli, a political exile, and becomes the playmate of Roma, the doctor's daughter. He assumes the name of Rosa. Years later Roma becomes Baron Bonelli's ward, and is supposed to have become his mistress. David is a socialist agitator, and is particularly passionate in denouncing the baron, who is also the prime minister of Italy. The baron arranges to have David killed, but Roma saves him. Later she is induced to betray him through lying promises of clemency for her husband. David thinks Roma has betrayed him intentionally. He kills the baron, and Roma assumes the blame for the crime. David befriended by the pope, discovers he is his father, and through the pope's influence Roma is freed and reunited to her husband.

Cast
Pauline Frederick - Donna Roma
Thomas Holding - David Rossi
Kittens Reichert - Little Roma
Arthur Oppenheim - Little David
George Stillwell - Leone
Della Bella - Leone's wife
Frank Losee - Baron Bonelli
Fuller Mellish - Pope Pius XI
J. Jiquel Lanoe - Charles Minghelli
George Majeroni - Dr. Roselli
John Clulow - Bruno Rocco
Amelia Rose - Elena Rocco
Freddie Verdi - Joseph Rocco
Lottie Alter - Princess Bellini
Lawrence Grant - English ambassador
Macy Harlan - Member of the Embassy
Walter Craven - Member of the Embassy
F.Gaillard - The Baker
Mary Lander - The Baker's Wife
Robert Vivian - Father Pifferi
Herbert Huben - Padrone
William Lloyd - Felice
J. Albert Hall - Prosecuting Attorney

Production
The film was shot on location in London and at the Roman Forum, the Colosseum, and the Vatican gardens in Rome, Italy. Production was interrupted by World War I, and the remainder of the film was shot in New York City.

The $100,000 budget was the most costly Famous Players had attempted. According to Adolf Zukor, Edwin S. Porter reached a new high with his camera work. One long scene showed Thomas Holding as David Rossi, pleading with Fuller Mellish as the pope during a walk in the Vatican gardens. Unfortunately Holding clutched Mellish’s arm. After the company returned they learned that no one was allowed to touch the pope in such a manner. It was possible that Catholics might take offence. Hall Caine had been an adversary of the Catholic Church which complicated the matter further. The film was in trouble. A ban by the Catholic church risked putting Famous Players out of business. As much as possible of the offending scene was cut but some had to stay. There only other option was to postpone the release and send the company back to Rome. By this time, extensive distribution plans had been made. Zukor called on Bishop, later Cardinal Hayes and explained their innocent mistake. Hayes was sympathetic, and the film was released. Afterwards Zukor and Hayes became good friends, often discussing the moral and religious implications of the film.

Release
The Eternal City had its first showing at the Lyceum theatre on 27 December 1914 and was given a run at the Lyceum. The film was not released on the Paramount Film Corporation program as was usual. Famous Players created the Select Booking Agency to distribute initially The Eternal City and other prestigious feature-length films before being turned over to Paramount.

Hall Caine cabled the producers after attending the British premiere at Marble Arch Pavilion to congratulate them. “It follows my story with an exactness that is remarkable. The pictures of The Eternal City convey just the idea and infuse just the atmosphere that I strove to impart to the book. I am delighted with the film and I only hope that those who see it in the picture theatre will derive as much pleasure as I myself did”. The film was re-released in 1918 as part of the Paramount "Success Series".

The Canadian Board of Censors barred the film from the province of Quebec on the grounds that the story of David Leone, the foundling son of Pope Pius XI, would prove offensive to the majority Roman Catholics.

Reception
By the time The Eternal City opened at the Astor Theatre in New York on 12 April 1915, it was proclaimed to be one of the foremost features produced in the United States.

Kinematograph Weekly said in part: “We congratulate the Famous Players Film Company upon the complete and signal success of their effort in every way, for the production stands out as one of the best that has been submitted for public approval. It is a real classic in picture production, and words are inadequate to thoroughly express our full and emphatic admiration of the subject, which we are convinced will meet with as hearty a reception from the public as any previous subject has yet employed.” The Bioscope wrote "Thanks to its makers The Eternal City is a production planned and executed on a grand scale. In Mr. Caine’s novel the producers had a story giving the utmost scope for spectacular display and scenic ornamentation. They determined to make the very best of their material."

References

External links

American movie herald or lobby card (archived)
Italian theatre advert

1915 films
1915 drama films
Silent American drama films
American silent feature films
American black-and-white films
Famous Players-Lasky films
Films based on British novels
American films based on plays
Films shot in London
Films shot in Rome
Films shot in New York City
Lost American films
Films based on multiple works
1915 lost films
Lost drama films
Films directed by Edwin S. Porter
Films directed by Hugh Ford
1910s American films